Stefan Flukowski (1902–1972) was a Polish writer, poet and translator. Recognized as a major Polish representative of surrealism.

His most notable piece of work being Wiersze

1902 births
1972 deaths
Polish male writers
Prisoners of Oflag II-C